Antal Kisteleki (born 16 January 1945) is a Hungarian gymnast. He competed in eight events at the 1972 Summer Olympics.

References

1945 births
Living people
Hungarian male artistic gymnasts
Olympic gymnasts of Hungary
Gymnasts at the 1972 Summer Olympics
Sportspeople from Székesfehérvár